Paola Hofer (born 29 January 1954) is a retired Italian alpine skier who competed in the 1976 Winter Olympics.

References

External links
 

1954 births
Living people
Italian female alpine skiers
Olympic alpine skiers of Italy
Alpine skiers at the 1976 Winter Olympics
Sportspeople from Südtirol
Germanophone Italian people
Place of birth missing (living people)